The  is an electric multiple unit (EMU) train type operated by the private railway operator Shin-Keisei Electric Railway since December 2019. It shares a common design with the Keisei 3100 series.

Design
The trains were jointly designed with Keisei Electric Railway and feature Shin-Keisei's "gentle pink" corporate design.

Formations
The 80000 series is formed as follows, with four motored cars and two trailer cars per set.

Technical specifications
The trains use SiC–VVVF inverters which control 3-phase AC motors. The motor inverters used on the 80000 series offer a 19% reduction in power consumption over the IGBT–VVVF inverters used on the N800 series.

Interior
Seating accommodation consists of longitudinal seating throughout, providing a seating capacity of 43 in the end cars and 49 in the intermediate cars. A wheelchair space is provided near the crew compartment of the first car, and intermediate cars feature a free space for wheelchairs as well as strollers.

The seats are of a high-back design; their backs are  higher than those of the N800 series. They are also thickened to make sitting in them more comfortable. The seat partitions and vestibules are made of tempered glass to create a sense of openness. Unlike the Keisei 3100 series's seats, the 80000 series's do not feature a foldable portion for storing luggage. 

The interior also includes 17-inch passenger information displays, security cameras, and ceiling-mounted Plasmacluster ion generators.

History
In April 2019, Shin-Keisei announced its plans to introduce a new six-car train in Winter 2019.

Delivery from the Nippon Sharyo plant in Toyokawa began in October 2019.

A public trial run was to be held on 21 December 2019, and the first unit entered service on 27 December.

The Keisei 3100 series used on the Narita Sky Access Line are eight-car EMUs based on this series of trains.

A second set was built in October 2021 to replace 8000 series set 8512.

The third set completed manufacturing in October 2022.

References

Electric multiple units of Japan
Train-related introductions in 2019
1500 V DC multiple units of Japan
Nippon Sharyo multiple units